Wilfred Gerald Edwards (1938 – 15 August 1992), known as Jackie Edwards, was a Jamaican musician, songwriter and record producer, whose career took in ska, R&B, soul, rocksteady, reggae, and ballads.

Career
Edwards was born in Jamaica in 1938 where he was raised with fourteen siblings. Strongly influenced by Nat King Cole, he began performing at the age of 14. He came to the attention of Chris Blackwell in 1959. Edwards had four number one singles in Jamaica between 1960 and 1961, all self-written ballads with Latin-influenced music.

When Blackwell set up Island Records in London in 1962, Edwards travelled with him. Edwards worked as a singer and songwriter for Island, recording as a solo artist and also duets with Millie Small, as well as performing duties such as delivering records. He wrote both "Keep On Running" and "Somebody Help Me", that became number one singles in the United Kingdom for The Spencer Davis Group. He continued to work as a recording artist himself, with regular album releases through to the mid-1980s. Much of his later work was produced by Bunny Lee, and he also worked with The Aggrovators. Dionne Bromfield covered his song "Oh Henry" on her album Introducing Dionne Bromfield in 2009.

Edwards worked as a producer, co-producing the 1977 album Move Up Starsky by The Mexicano. The majority of Edwards' catalogue is published through Fairwood Music (UK) Ltd.

He died in August 1992 from a heart attack.

Discography

Albums
The Most of Jackie Edwards (1963) – Island
Stand Up for Jesus (1964) – Island
Come on Home (1965) – Island
By Demand (1966) – Island
Pledging My Love (1966) – Island (with Millie Small)
Premature Golden Sands (1967) – Island
Put Your Tears Away (1969) – Island
I Do Love You (1972) – Trojan
Do You Believe in Love (1976) – Klik
African Language (1977) – Harry J Records
Let It Be Me (1978) – Jamaica Sound (with Hortense Ellis)
Tell Me Darling (1978) – Imperial
Sincerely (1978) – Trojan
Come to Me Softly (1979) – Third World
Nothing Takes the Place of You (1981) – Starlight
King of the Ghetto (1982) – Black Music
Tell It Like It Is (1982) – Starlight
Love & Affection (1983) – Sky Note (feat. Kate Swadling)
The Original 'Mr. Cool Ruler''' (1983) – Vista SoundsThe Dynamic Jackie Wilfred Edwards (1984) – BossMusical Treasures Disco Style (198?) – ImperialEndless Love (1986) – World EnterpriseHeart to Heart (1990) – JusticeEscape (1995) – Peter Pan IndustriesDearest (1995) – LagoonIn Paradise (1995) – Carl's Records

Compilation albumsThe Best of Jackie Edwards (1966) – IslandThe Best of Jackie & Millie (1967) – Trojan (with Millie Small)20 Greatest Hits (1977) – ConflictStarlight (1978) – Pye20 Super Hits (19??) – Sonic SoundsIn Paradise (1994) – TrojanMemorial (19??) – RhinoSinging Hits from Studio One and More (1995) – RhinoGreat Soul Hits: Put Your Tears Away (1997) – MarginalThis Is My Story: A History of Jamaica's Greatest Balladeer (2005) – TrojanI Feel So Bad (2006) – Castle50 Greatest Hits'' (2013) – Alexander Music Group

See also
List of reggae musicians

References

External links

Fairwood Music (UK) Ltd. Website
Jackie Edwards at Roots Archives

1938 births
1992 deaths
Jamaican songwriters
20th-century Jamaican male singers
Jamaican reggae singers
Jamaican reggae musicians
Trojan Records artists
Island Records artists